Andreea Mitu and Elena-Gabriela Ruse were the defending champions, but chose not to participate.

Xenia Knoll and Mandy Minella won the title, defeating Ylena In-Albon and Conny Perrin in the final, 6–3, 6–4.

Seeds

Draw

Draw

References
Main Draw

Montreux Ladies Open - Doubles
Montreux Ladies Open